Crassispira terebra is an extinct species of sea snail, a marine gastropod mollusk in the family Pseudomelatomidae, the turrids and allies.

Description
The length of the shell attains 28 mm.

Distribution
Fossils have been found in Oligocene strata in Aquitaine, France.

References

 Basterot, B. de. Description géologique du Bassin Tertiaire du Sud-Ouest de la France: Mémoires de la Sociéte d'histoire naturelle de Paris. 1825.
 Lozouet (P.), 2017 Les Conoidea de l’Oligocène supérieur (Chattien) du bassin de l’Adour (Sud-Ouest de la France). Cossmanniana, t. 19, p. 1-179

External links
 Worldwide Mollusc Species Data Base: Drillia terebra

terebra
Gastropods described in 1825